Przetocznica  is a village in the administrative district of Gmina Skąpe, within Świebodzin County, Lubusz Voivodeship, in western Poland. 

The village has a population of 41.

Notable people
Anna Louisa Karsch (1722–1791), poet

References

Przetocznica